There exist Ahmadiyya translations of the Quran in over 70 languages. Portions of the scripture have been translated into multiple other languages. The Lahore Ahmadiyya Movement has produced translations into at least 7 languages. The period of the late 1980s and the early 1990s saw an acceleration in the number of translations being produced by the Ahmadiyya movement.

Some of the earliest translations were produced by Ahmadiyya scholars and today there are still many languages for which only translations authored by Ahmadiyya Community exist. All translations are published alongside the Arabic text.

Publications

The Quran translations authored by Ahmadiyya scholars always feature translated verses alongside the original Arabic text. Before the translations are published, they are checked, scrutinized and proof-read by a wide array of individuals for errors. A similar procedure is undertaken when revised versions of the translations are produced. In particular, guidance is sought from the caliph of the Community with regards to textual and other linguistic difficulties. Since the majority of the Quran translations have been made available from the 1980s, most translations have sought advice from Caliph IV and Caliph V.

Complete translations

European languages

South Asian languages

Southeast Asian languages

Exegesis

Portions
The portions translations are mainly "selected verses", but there are also some translations that just have translated some parts. The selected verses are created for celebrating the centenary of Ahmadiyya Community in 1989.

See also
List of translations of the Quran
English translations of the Quran

Notes

References

Ahmadiyya literature
Quran translations